The Handa Cup is a series of senior women's golf matches between a United States team and a World Team drawn from players from the rest of the world. It was founded in 2006 and is an event on the LPGA Legends Tour. Since 2013 it has been officially known as the ISPS Handa Cup, named after its sponsor, Haruhisa Handa.

The 2015 event was held on November 13–14 at Palm Aire Country Club, Sarasota, Florida.

The format is drawn from the Ryder Cup and similar team events, consisting of twelve players per side and a non-playing captain, usually a highly respected golf figure. The captains are responsible for pairing the teams in the pairs events, which consist of both alternate shot and best ball formats (also known as "foursome" and "four ball" matches respectively).

Results
Source:

Format
The match is held over two days; Saturday and Sunday except in 2008 and 2015 when it was held on a Friday and Saturday. Pairs matches are played on the first day with single matches on the final day. Unlike most other team events, two points are awarded for a win and one point for a halved match. Until 2011 it was a match play event but from 2012 it changed to stroke play.

From 2014 the event has consisted of six best-ball matches on the first morning, six modified alternate shot matches on the first afternoon and 12 singles matches on the second day. The first day matches are over 9 holes while the second day matches are over 18 holes. All matches are stroke play. Two points are awarded to the winner of each match with 1 point each for a tied match.

Appearances
Source:

United States
This is a complete list of golfers who have played for the United States.
Amy Alcott: 2006, 2007, 2008, 2009, 2010
Danielle Ammaccapane: 2015
Pat Bradley: 2006, 2007, 2008, 2009, 2010, 2011, 2012, 2013, 2014, 2015
JoAnne Carner: 2006, 2007, 2008, 2009, 2010, 2011
Beth Daniel: 2007, 2008, 2009, 2010, 2011, 2012, 2013, 2014, 2015
Cindy Figg-Currier: 2008, 2012, 2013
Jane Geddes: 2006
Sandra Haynie: 2006, 2007, 2008, 2009
Pat Hurst: 2015
Juli Inkster: 2014, 2015
Christa Johnson: 2006, 2007, 2008, 2009, 2010, 2011, 2012, 2013, 2014, 2015
Rosie Jones: 2006, 2007, 2008, 2009, 2010, 2011, 2012, 2013, 2014, 2015
Betsy King: 2012, 2013
Nancy Lopez: 2011, 2012, 2013
Marilyn Lovander: 2006, 2007, 2008
Meg Mallon: 2010, 2011, 2014, 2015
Barb Mucha: 2013, 2014, 2015
Martha Nause: 2006
Cindy Rarick: 2006, 2007, 2008, 2009, 2010, 2011, 2012, 2013
Michele Redman: 2011, 2015
Laurie Rinker: 2013, 2014, 2015
Nancy Scranton: 2007, 2009, 2010, 2011, 2012, 2013, 2014
Patty Sheehan: 2006, 2007, 2008, 2009, 2010, 2011, 2012
Val Skinner: 2014
Sherri Steinhauer: 2010, 2011, 2012, 2014
Kris Tschetter: 2015
Sherri Turner: 2007, 2008, 2009, 2010, 2012, 2013, 2014
Colleen Walker: 2009

World
This is a complete list of golfers who have played for the rest of the World team.

 Helen Alfredsson: 2012, 2013, 2014, 2015
 Dawn Coe-Jones: 2006, 2007, 2008, 2009, 2010, 2011, 2012, 2014
 Jane Crafter: 2010, 2012, 2013, 2014, 2015
 Laura Davies: 2013, 2014, 2015
 Alicia Dibos: 2006, 2007, 2008, 2009, 2010, 2011, 2012, 2013, 2014, 2015
 Wendy Doolan: 2014, 2015
 Maria Alice Gonzalez: 2006, 2007
 Gail Graham: 2009, 2010, 2011, 2012, 2013
 Nancy Harvey: 2007, 2008, 2009, 2010, 2011
 Masumi Inaba: 2008
 Lorie Kane: 2010, 2011, 2012, 2013, 2014, 2015
 Trish Johnson: 2013, 2014, 2015
 Jenny Lidback: 2008, 2009, 2010, 2011, 2012, 2013, 2014, 2015
 Sally Little: 2007, 2009, 2010, 2011, 2012
 Catriona Matthew: 2015
 Liselotte Neumann: 2011, 2013, 2014, 2015
 Alison Nicholas: 2008, 2009, 2010, 2011, 2012, 2013, 2014
 Catrin Nilsmark: 2012
 Mieko Nomura: 2006, 2007, 2008, 2009, 2010, 2011, 2013, 2014, 2015
 Michiko Okada: 2006, 2007, 2008, 2009
 Anne Marie Palli: 2006, 2007, 2008, 2009, 2010, 2011, 2012
 Catherine Panton-Lewis: 2006
 Barb Scherbak: 2006, 2007, 2008
 Jan Stephenson: 2006, 2007, 2008, 2009, 2010, 2012, 2013, 2015
 Aiko Takasu: 2009
 Tina Tombs: 2008, 2011
 Angie Tsai: 2006, 2007
 Nayoko Yoshikawa: 2006, 2007

Notes and references

External links
2015 Handa Cup

Team golf tournaments
Women's golf tournaments
Recurring sporting events established in 2006
Legends Tour
International Sports Promotion Society